Svartifoss (Icelandic for "black waterfall") is a waterfall in Skaftafell in Vatnajökull National Park in Iceland, and is one of the most popular sights in the park. It is surrounded by dark lava columns, which gave rise to its name.

The base of this waterfall is noteworthy for its sharp rocks. New hexagonal column sections break off faster than the falling water wears down the edges.

These basalt columns have provided inspiration for Icelandic architects, most visibly in the Hallgrímskirkja church in Reykjavík, and also the National Theatre.

Gallery

References

External links 
 Information about hiking routes in Skaftafell, including Svartifoss.

See also 

 List of columnar basalts in Iceland
 List of waterfalls in Iceland

Columnar basalts in Iceland
Waterfalls of Iceland